Bredeney is a southern borough of the city of Essen, Germany. It was incorporated into the city in 1915. Around 10,700 people live here. Bredeney is known to be a wealthy borough and the "green lung" of the city.

Lake Baldeney and the Villa Hügel, heritage of the Krupp family are located here, as well as Essen-Hügel station.

Geography 
Bredeney borders the boroughs of Heisingen to the east, Fischlaken and Werden to the south, Schuir and Haarzopf in the west, and Margarethenhöhe, Rüttenscheid and Stadtwald in the north.

Sources 

Essen